Heartbreak often refers to the state of having a broken heart, a metaphor for a feeling of rejection by a loved one or of emotional devastation (as in mourning).

Heartbreak or heart break may also refer to:

Film & television
Heartbreak (1931 film), a film starring Charles Farrell
Heartbreak (1979 film), a Canadian drama film
“Heartbreak”, an episode of The Good Doctor

Music
Heartbreak (band), an italo/electro band from the UK
 Heart Break (Lady Antebellum album), 2017
"Heart Break" (Lady Antebellum song), 2017
Heart Break, 1988 album by New Edition
Heartbreak (Bert Jansch album), 1982
Heartbreak (Shalamar album), 1984
"Heartbreak" (M'Black song), 2009
"Heartbreak (Make Me a Dancer)", a 2009 song by Freemasons feat. Sophie Ellis-Bextor
"Heartbreak Song", a 2016 song by Mickey Guyton
"Heartbreak", a 2012 song by Age of Consent
"Heartbreak", a song by Hunter Hayes from his 2019 album Wild Blue (Part I)
"Heartbreak" (Minho song), a 2021 song by Choi Min-ho

See also
Heartbreak Hill (disambiguation)
Heartbreak Hotel (disambiguation)
Heartbreaker (disambiguation)